"Cherchez La Ghost" is a song from Supreme Clientele, the second album by rapper Ghostface Killah, and features fellow Wu-Tang Clan member U-God and singer Madam Majestic.

It was released as the album's second single, with an accompanying music video directed by Little X.

The song was later added to his greatest hits album Shaolin's Finest.

Song title
Produced by Carlos Bess,
the song samples "Greedy G" by Brentford All Stars and the 1976 song "Cherchez La Femme" by Dr. Buzzard's Original Savannah Band.

Charts

References

1999 songs
2000 singles
Ghostface Killah songs
Music videos directed by Director X
Songs written by KRS-One
Songs written by August Darnell